Luis Figueroa (born September 18, 1989 in Philadelphia, Pennsylvania, U.S.) is a two-time Latin GRAMMY nominated singer and songwriter of Puerto Rican origin of the Latin pop and Tropical music genres. He studied at the Berklee College of Music and in his teens he participated in shows such as Star Search, Sábado Gigante and American Idol.

He has gained international recognition after covering songs by artists like Elijah Blake, Trey Songz, and Omarion on YouTube. As a result of his version of "Flor Palida" he caught the attention of singer Marc Anthony, which led him to sign an agreement with Magnus, the salsa star’s record label.

In 2018, he accompanied Romeo Santos as a vocalist on three of his international tours, including the world tour "Golden".

In 2019, he released his first single for Sony Music Latin, “La Especialista”, which reached number 27 on Billboard Latin Pop Airplay chart, remaining for 8 weeks, and the pre-release single from his debut album, “Te Deseo ”, peaked at number 24 on Latin Pop Airplay chart, spending 11 weeks on Billboard.

He has received an award at the Premios Juventud (2016) for his version of “Flor Pálida”, performing with Marc Anthony live on the Univisión channel.

In 2021, he was nominated for "Best Pop Artist" at the 2021 HTV Heat Latin Music Awards.

In 2022, Luis released his first salsa album, the self-titled Luis Figueroa.  The album spawned three consecutive Top 10 hits on the Billboard Tropical Airplay chart and earned him his first Latin GRAMMY award nominations for “Best Salsa Album” and “Best Tropical Song”.  The album written by Luis solidified his status as one of the leading voices and rising stars of the salsa genre.

Early years 
During his upbringing in his mother's Puerto Rican home, he was captivated by the music that surrounded him, based on its origins in Aibonito, Puerto Rico. He started playing the guitar, drums and piano at a young age, and his interest in singing, as well as his vocal performance, led him to have early recognition in the Puerto Rican musical community, collaborating with artists such as Johnny Rivera, La India, and Domingo Quiñones.

Musical career 
As a teenager, he was a contestant on the talent shows Star Search, in 2003, and American Idol (Season Six), in 2007.

In 2007, he also  entered the Berklee College of Music in Boston, and the following year began to upload versions of songs to the YouTube platform. His version of Luke James´ "I Want You" was seen by one of the song's co-authors, Nasri Atweh, lead singer of the Canadian group Magic! Atweh, who invites him to travel to Los Angeles and work with him on songwriting and music production.

In 2014, he uploaded his version of  Flor pálida, by Marc Anthony.

In 2015, while in Malaga, Spain, he  found out  through Atweh that his YouTube videos had been viewed by singer Marc Anthony. The following year, Luis signed with Magnus Media, Marc Anthony's entertainment company. The night of the signing, he received an award from Premios Juventud for his version of Marc's “Flor Pálida”, which the two performed together live on Univisión television network.

In 2017, he appeared at the Billboard Latin Music Awards on Telemundo, televised internationally for all of Latin America. That same year he released his single, "Hopeless" under the Magnus Media label, and accompanied Romeo Santos as a vocalist on three of his international tours, including the Golden Tour in 2018.

Combining his musical career with acting, he spent six months in Mexico filming the musical-themed series Guerra De Ídolos (2017), playing the fictional urban artist Diego Santillán and singing the show's theme song.

In 2018, he collaborated with Norwegian EDM artist Matoma, on the single "Telepatía".

“La Especialista” and debut cover-album "Canciones del Alma" 
In 2019, he released his first single with Sony Music Latin, “La Especialista” which peaked at number 27 on Billboard Latin Pop Airplay chart and spent 8 weeks on the charts.

In February 2020, he released the cumbia fused single, “Te Deseo”, as an official pre-release to his debut album, which peaked at number 24 on Latin Pop Airplay chart and spent 11 weeks on Billboard.

In April 2021, he released the cover of “Hasta el Sol de Hoy”. The original song was written by Oscar Domingo Derudi. It became a hit in 1993 when it was recorded by Edgar Joel and his orchestra along with Luis's uncle Anthony Colón on lead vocals. Luis' cover was released in two versions: one acoustic and one salsa and was the first single from his debut, full-length cover-album "Canciones del Alma" which was released in May 2021. In an interview he gave to SounDarts.gr he mentioned "I wanted to take the opportunity for people to get to know me a little bit through songs that they are familiar with. Also I wanted them to really see and hear me to the capacity that I can use my voice. I think, there was no better moment for this to be the first album and something that people would really get to listen to because the familiarity of the songs is what is gonna get their attention".

In addition to  April 2021, Luis was featured on the Billboard: Latin Artist on the Rise article highlighting his accomplishments thus far. Luis joined Marc Anthony's Pa'lla Voy Tour in October, November and December as a special guest.

In May, he released his debut album, Canciones Del Alma, 10 romantic tracks that comprised Luis’s deepest memories of family, musical growth, and key songs that shaped his career.  The album debuted at #2 in album sales in Puerto Rico.

Luis received his first number #1 on Billboard Tropical Airplay with "Hasta el Sol de Hoy" on July 27 2021, making this one of his greatest accomplishments and quoting Marc Anthony saying "Esto Sigue." Follow up single, " Si Tu Me Dices Ven" became his second consecutive #1 when it topped the Mediabase Tropical Chart in late November.

"Canciones del Alma" visual album was released on Youtube in November 2021 which included songs, "Tù con Él", "Qué Hay de Malo", "Historia de Un Amor" and more following a TV special that premiered on Telemundo Puerto Rico.

“Luis Figueroa" Album 
In anticipation for the release of his first salsa project of all new material, Luis released the lead single, “Todavía Te Espero” in late March of 2022.  The song written by himself and ICON became a huge hit reaching #3 on Billboard Tropical Airplay, #1 on the Mediabase Tropical chart and #15 on Billboard Latin Airplay.  Luis Figueroa was released on May 19, 2022, the album is a collection of songs that represent the different phases of falling in love, complete with a tropical energy full of percussion and trombones while highlighting his dynamic vocals.  “Quality product rooted in romance and hard-hitting syncopations, Luis Figueroa has not only discovered his sound but also has embraced it.  Figueroa is marking his territory in the tropical genre" - Billboard.  “Vienes” was released as the second single, following the success of “Todavía Te Espero”. The song hit the Top 10 of Billboard Tropical Airplay and #1 on the Mediabase Tropical chart. “Vienes” was also an international success reaching top 10 on the tropical charts in Panama (#1), Ecuador, Dominican Republic and Colombia.  He gave a show stopping performance of the song live on Premios Juventud in Puerto Rico and sang in the tribute medley for El Gran Combo de Puerto Rico.
 
In June, Luis was selected by the National Puerto Rican Day Parade in New York City as a “Rising Star”, the same weekend he performed in the New York Salsa Festival at the Barclays Center in Brooklyn.  He was nominated for “Best Tropical Artist” for the 2022 Heat Latin Music Awards.  The Latin GRAMMY nominated song, “Fiesta Contigo” (co-written with Yoel Henriquez & Efraín “E_Flat" Gonzalez) became his third straight top 10 hit from the album on the Billboard charts.  He performed the song live at the Latin GRAMMY premiere ceremony in Las Vegas and it hit #1 on the Mediabase Tropical chart in late January of 2023.
  
Luis Figueroa was selected by Billboard Magazine as one of “The 22 Best Latin Albums of 2022 So Far".  He was also chosen by editors as one of the new Contenders for the Latin GRAMMY.  In the fall, Luis toured as a special guest on El Gran Combo De Puerto Rico’s 60th Anniversary U.S. tour.  He also performed as part of Marc Anthony’s Viviendo concerts in San Juan, Puerto Rico at the Choliseo receiving rave reviews from press and fans.  For the second year in a row he finished top 10 on the Billboard Year End Tropical Airplay Artist chart.
 
Luis closed the year, releasing the holiday song, “La Clave” a tropical-urban Caribbean fusion celebrating the traditions of Christmas.  The song was used in a national Christmas campaign in Puerto Rico and became his sixth straight entry on the Billboard Tropical charts.

Contributions as a composer 
As a songwriter, he has collaborated with artists such as Sebastián Yatra and Lary Over, on the urban pop hit "Por Perro", which has amassed more than 600 million views on YouTube and peaked at No. 16 on Billboard's Latin Pop Songs. “Por Perro” has also been certified Quadruple Platinum by the RIAA, and was nominated for Video of the Year at the 2019 HTV Heat Latin Music Awards.

He wrote the spanish version of “Cross Your Mind” for Sabrina Claudio featured on the Fifty Shades Freed Original Motion Picture Soundtrack.

Songs 

 "Flor Palida" (2016)
 "Hopeless" (2017)
 "Por perro" (2019)
 "La Especialista" (2019)
 "Te Deseo" (2020)
 "Noche de Paz" (2020)
 "Recuerda" (2021)
 "9PM" (2021)
 "PrimeraVez" (2021)
 "DimePorque" (2021)
 "Tírame" (2021)
 "Desigual" (2021)
 "Vuela - Remix" (2021)
 "Hasta El Sol de Hoy" (2021)
 "Si Tú Me Dices Ven” (2021)
 "Tú Con Él" (2021)
 "Qué Hay de Malo" (2021)
 "Historia de Un Amor" (2021)
 "Si Te Vas" (2021)
 "Ese" (2021)
 "Todo y Nada" (2021)
 "A Puro Dolor" (2021)
 "Ángel" (2021)
 "Todavía Te Espero" (2022)
 "Vienes" (2022)
 "9PM" (Versión Salsa) (2022)
 "Un Montón De Estrellas" (2022)
 "Fiesta Contigo" (2022)
 "La Clave" (2022)

Albums 

 1807 ( 2021) 
 Canciones del Alma (2021) 
 Luis Figueroa (2022)

Awards and nominations

Latin GRAMMY Awards 
 2022 - Best Salsa Album - Luis Figueroa
 2022 - Best Tropical Song - “Fiesta Contigo"

Premio Lo Nuestro 
 2022 - Tropical Artist of the Year 
 2022 - Tropical Song of the Year - “Hasta El Sol De Hoy”
 2023 - Tropical Artist of the Year
 2023 - Tropical Album of the Year - Luis Figueroa
 2023 - Tropical Song of the Year - “Todavía Te Espero”

Premios Juventud 
 2016 - Best Cover Video - “Flor Pálida” - Won
 2022 - Best Tropical Hit - “Hasta El Sol De Hoy”

Heat Latin Music Awards 
 2021- Latin Pop Artist of the Year
 2022 - Tropical Artist of the Year

References

External links 
 Official website

1989 births
Living people
American male pop singers
21st-century Puerto Rican male singers
Spanish-language singers